Face time is an English idiom for direct personal interaction or contact between two or more people at the same time and physical location. Face time therefore occurs in "real life" and contrasts primarily with interaction or contact which occurs over distance (e.g., via telephone) and/or electronically (e.g., via email, instant messaging, e-commerce, social media, or computer simulations).

The term was originally a colloquialism but has entered the vernacular with the increasing number of people throughout the world who commonly and extensively rely on telecommunications and the Internet for personal and business communication.

See also

 Digitality
 Principle of locality
 Social alienation
 Synchronicity

Further reading
 Newsroom politics: Getting face time
 Has eLearning Revolutionized Education?

External links
 The Importance of Face Time – an article
 Favouring Face Time – an article
 Merriam-Websters Dictionary
 Bartleby Dictionary
 article on shrinking face time

Information Age
1990s neologisms